The Gran Premio 25 de Mayo is a Group 1 horse race run at Hipódromo de San Isidro, in Buenos Aires, Argentina.

Since 2012, the winner receives a “Win and You're In” berth into the Breeders' Cup Turf through the international Breeders' Cup Challenge.

Records since 1989 
Speed record:

 2:23.57 – Seaborg (1996)

Most wins:

 3 – Ordak Dan (2013, 2015, 2017)
 2 – Sea Girl (1997, 1998)

Most wins by a jockey:

 3 – Juan J. Paule (1991, 1995, 1996)
 3 – Pablo Gustavo Falero (1992, 1993, 2001)
 3 – Juan Carlos Noriega (2004, 2008, 2011)
 3 – Jorge Antonio Ricardo (2015, 2016, 2019)

Most wins by a trainer:

 4 – Alfredo F. Gaitán Dassie (1991, 1996, 1997, 1998)

Most wins by an owner:

 3 – Misterio (GGUAY) (2013, 2015, 2017)
 3 – Rio Claro (SI) (1996, 1997, 1998)

Most wins by a breeder:

 3 – Haras Santa Maria de Araras (2010, 2011, 2021)
 3 – Haras Caryjuan (2013, 2015, 2017)

Greatest winning margin:

 12 lengths – Sir Winsalot (2014)

Winners since 1989

Earlier Winners 

 1940: Judea
 1941: Blackie
 1945: Half Crown
 1959: La Rubia
 1960: Escorial
 1961: Arturo A
 1962: Arturo A
 1963: Dorine
 1965: Charolais
 1966: Luciano Diez
 1967: Gobernado
 1968: Azincourt
 1969: Indian Chief
 1970: Up
 1971: Borobeta
 1972: El Virtuoso
 1973: Redtop
 1974: Circinus
 1975: Keats
 1976: Contraventora
 1977: Dioico
 1978: Mister Brea
 1981: Campero
 1982: New Dandy
 1983: Juez de Pan
 1984: New Dandy
 1985: Reverente
 1986: Newmarket
 1987: Nuevo Poderoso
 1988: Pranke

References

Breeders' Cup Challenge series
Horse races in Argentina